Valeriu Cosarciuc (born 24 November 1955) is a Moldovan politician, who served as Deputy Prime Minister in the Dumitru Braghiș Cabinet (between 21 December 1999 and 19 April 2001), coordinating the government's activities in the field of industry, energy, agriculture, communications and the environment. He was the Minister of Agriculture and Food Industry in the First Vlad Filat Cabinet. He is a member of the Party Alliance Our Moldova.

Biography 
Valeriu Cosarciuc was born on 24 November 1955 in Clocușna, Ocnița District. He studied in 1972-1977 at the Polytechnic Institute of Chișinău (now Technical University of Moldova), obtaining a diploma of engineer specialized in machine building technology, lathes and tools. After graduating from the Faculty in 1977, he was employed as a technology engineer at the "Microprovod" in Chișinău. From 1980 he was transferred to the position of head of the technological group at "Moldselmaș" in the city of Bălți, being advanced in 1986 as the main technologist. Between 1989-1995 he served as head of the "Agroteh" factory of "Moldselmaș" and since 1995 he has been elected chairman of the Board of Directors of "Moldagrotehnica", whose task is to ensure effective economic and financial activity and enterprise development. During this time, he studied at the Academy of National Economy in Moscow (1990-1992). 

In the preliminary parliamentary elections of 25 February 2001, he was elected a deputy on the list of the "BraghișAlliance", serving as vice-president of the Committee on Economy, Industry, Budget and Finance. 

He is reelected as a deputy on the electoral roll from the Electoral Bloc Democratic Moldova at the parliamentary elections of 6 March 2005, becoming chairman of Parliament's Committee on Agriculture and Food Industry. Between 23 April 2001 - 25 August 2005 and 23 January 2006 he was the representative of the Republic of Moldova at the Parliamentary Assembly of the Council of Europe. 

Besides Russian and Romanian, he also speaks English. He is married and has a son.

External links 
 Government of Moldova

References

 

Living people
1955 births
People from Ocnița District
Members of the parliament of Moldova
Our Moldova Alliance politicians
Deputy Prime Ministers of Moldova
Moldovan Ministers of Agriculture
Moldovan MPs 2001–2005
Moldovan MPs 2005–2009

Recipients of the Order of Honour (Moldova)